Kamil Rychlicki (born 1 November 1996) is a Luxembourgish volleyball player of Polish descent, member of the Luxembourgish national  team. At the professional club level, he plays for the Italian team, Sir Safety Perugia.

His parents also played volleyball with father Jacek being a silver medallist of the 1983 European Championship with his national team.

Sporting achievements

Clubs
Luxembourg Cup:
  2013, 2014, 2015, 2016
Luxembourg Championship:
  2014, 2015, 2016
  2013
Belgian SuperCup:
  2016
Belgium Championship:
  2016
  2018
  2017
ItalianSuperCup:
  2022

FIVB Club World Championship
  Brazil 2019 – with Cucine Lube Civitanova
  Brazil 2022 – with Sir Safety Susa Perugia

National Team
European Championship of the Small Countries Juniors:
  2012
European Championship of the Small Countries:
  2015, 2017
  2013

References

External links

 
 Player profile at LegaVolley.it  
 Player profile at Volleybox.net

1996 births
Living people
People from Ettelbruck
Luxembourgian men's volleyball players
Luxembourgian people of Polish descent
Expatriate volleyball players in Belgium
Expatriate volleyball players in Italy
Volley Lube players
Opposite hitters